Jussi Tapio (born April 10, 1986) is a Finnish former professional ice hockey player.

Tapio played in the SM-liiga for Lukko and TPS.

See also
Ice hockey in Finland

References

External links

1986 births
Living people
Aalborg Pirates players
Asplöven HC players
Finnish ice hockey right wingers
Hokki players
Lukko players
Odense Bulldogs players
Podhale Nowy Targ players
Sportspeople from Turku
HC TPS players
TuTo players
Újpesti TE (ice hockey) players
Vaasan Sport players
1. EV Weiden players
EK Zell am See players